Bill Hudson (born June 27, 1966 in Los Angeles) is an American former alpine skier who competed in the 1988 Winter Olympics.

External links
 sports-reference.com
 

1966 births
Living people
American male alpine skiers
Olympic alpine skiers of the United States
Alpine skiers at the 1988 Winter Olympics
Sportspeople from Los Angeles
People from Olympic Valley, California
20th-century American people